A list of bascule bridges by country:

Australia 

 Birkenhead Bridge carries traffic across the Port River at Port Adelaide
 Tom 'Diver' Derrick Bridge - Port Adelaide, South Australia, single leaf road bascule
 Mary MacKillop Bridge - Port Adelaide, South Australia, single leaf rail bascule
 Batemans Bay Bridge, Batemans Bay, New South Wales, over the Clyde River - replaced by new bridge in 2021
 Spit Bridge - Sydney
 Grafton Bridge (New South Wales) - Grafton, New South Wales rail lower deck, road upper deck - lift span out of use
 Narooma Bridge - Narooma, still in use in 2010
 Carrathool Bridge - Carrathool, New South Wales, across the Murrumbidgee River - the last surviving example of a particular type of bascule lift span
 Broadwater Bridge, across the Richmond River - built using the renovated bascule span from the demolished Barneys Point Bridge on the Tweed River (New South Wales), converted from counterweight to hydraulic ram lift.
 Bridge on Franklin Wharf, Constitution Dock, Hobart
 Marina Bridge - Bridge over Auckland Creek, on Bryan Jordan Dr, West Gladstone

Belgium 

 Berendrecht Bridge, Antwerp, 68 m long span across the Berendrecht Lock at Port of Antwerp
 Oudendijk Bridge, Antwerp, 68 m long span across the Berendrecht Lock at Port of Antwerp
 Zandvliet Bridge, Antwerp, 57 m long span across the Zandvliet Lock at Port of Antwerp
 Frederik Hendrik Bridge, Antwerp, 57 m long span across the Zandvliet Lock at Port of Antwerp
 Van Cauwelaert Bridge, Antwerp, 35 m long span across the Van Cauwelaert Lock at Port of Antwerp
 Kruisschans Bridge, Antwerp, 35 m long span across the Van Cauwelaert Lock at Port of Antwerp
 Wilmarsdonk Bridge, Antwerp, 35 m span at Port of Antwerp
 Farnese Bridge, Beveren, across the Kallo Lock at Port of Antwerp
 Melsele Bridge, Beveren, across the Kallo Lock at Port of Antwerp
 Boulevard Bridge (Willebroek), Willebroek, 57 m span
 Nijverheid Bridge, Puurs
 Scheldt Bridge Bornem-Temse, Temse, 50 m span
 Scheldt Bridge Temse-Bornem, Temse, double bascule bridge, span 50m
 Herders Bridge, Bruges, 25.5 m span
 Dampoort Bridges, Bruges, both spans 20 m
 Boudewijn Bridge, Bruges
 Zelzate Bridge, Zelzate, double bascule bridge
 Schuitenier Bridge, Leuven, 12 m span

Canada 
 Barra Strait Bridge, crossing the Barra Strait of Bras d'Or Lake in Nova Scotia
 Johnson Street Bridge, across the Victoria Harbour Victoria, British Columbia
 Jackknife Bascule Bridge, over the Kaministiquia River in Thunder Bay, Ontario
 Bridges 1 (Lakeshore Road Bridge), 3A (Carlton Street Bridge), 4 (Homer Bridge [Queenston Road]), 6 (Flight Locks Railway Bridge for Canadian National Railways), 19 (Main Street Bridge [Port Colborne]) and 19A (Mellanby Avenue Bridge) on the Welland Canal. Save for Bridges 3A and 19A, all of these were built during the late 1920s as part of the Fourth Canal expansion project (1913-1932). Bridge 3A was built to replace the original Bridge 3, which was destroyed in an accident. Bridge 19A was constructed in the 1980s to alleviate traffic on Bridge 19 (both bridges lie on either end of Lock 8). Bridge 4 is a twin-leaf, Chicago-type bascule bridge, with its counterweights located under the road deck. All the other bascule bridges on the Welland Canal are single-leaf Rall-type bridges, with counterweights suspended on a frame structure over the roadway.
 La Salle Causeway lift bridge - Kingston, Ontario
 Cherry Street Strauss Trunnion Bascule Bridge, in Toronto
 Cherry Street lift bridge over the Keating Channel, in Toronto
 CN Bridge, across the Red River, Winnipeg, Manitoba (non functional)
 Murray Street Bridge, Sydenham River, Wallaceburg, Ontario
 Dundas Street Bridge, Sydenham River, Wallaceburg, Ontario
 Lord Selkirk Bridge, Sydenham River, Wallaceburg Ontario
 King George VI lift Bridge, Kettle Creek, Port Stanley, Ontario
 Canadian National Railway, over Rideau Canal, Abbott Street, Smiths Falls, Ontario (National Historic Site)

China 
 , across Hai River in Tianjin

Croatia 
 Osor Bridge in Osor
 Trogir Bridge in Trogir

Denmark 
 Guldborgsund Bridge in Guldborg
 Knippelsbro in Copenhagen
 Langebro in Copenhagen
 Jernbanebroen over Limfjorden in Aalborg
 Limfjordsbroen in Aalborg

Finland 

 Lauttasaari bridge in Helsinki, connecting the island of Lauttasaari to the mainland

France 

 Pegasus Bridge, Ouistreham, Normandy
 Sadi-Carnot Bridge, Sète, Hérault

Germany 
 Bascule bridge, Potshausen, Lower Saxony, Germany
 Wolgast-Usedom Bridge, Wolgast, Mecklenburg-Vorpommern, Germany
 Wiecker Bridge, Greifswald, Mecklenburg-Vorpommern, Germany
 Lindaunis Bridge, Boren, Schleswig-Holstein, Germany

Ireland 
 East-Link, Dublin

India 
 Pamban Bridge, Rameswaram, Tamil Nadu
 Bascule bridge Kidderpore Kolkata (Calcutta), 127 years old.
 Bascule bridge at Kochi, Kerala

Indonesia 
 Batu Rusa II Bridge, Merawang, Bangka

Japan 

 Blue Wing Moji, Kitakyūshū
 Nagahama Ohashi Bridge, Ōzu

Korea 

 Yeongdo Bridge, Yeongdo, Busan

Malaysia 
 Kuala Terengganu Drawbridge, Kuala Terengganu, Terengganu

Netherlands 
Note that in Dutch basculebrug only refers to bascule bridges that have their counterweight rigidly connected to the bridge deck. If there is a hinged connection, it's referred to as ophaalbrug (literally "drawbridge"). This list lists both, and is incomplete as there are many such bridges in the Netherlands.

 Erasmusbrug, Rotterdam
 Ketelbrug, Flevoland
 Koninginnebrug, Rotterdam
 Koningin Julianabrug (Alphen aan den Rijn)
 Magere Brug, Amsterdam
 Nieuwe Amstelbrug, Amsterdam
 Overtoomse Sluis, Amsterdam (bridge no. 199)
 Scharrebiersluis, Amsterdam
 :nl:Schinkelbrug, Amsterdam (bridge no. 176P, consisting of 5 parallel bridges for road, rail, and metro)
 Slauerhoffbrug, Leeuwarden
 Spinozabrug, Utrecht
 :nl:Brug 360, (Théophile de Bockbrug)
 Torontobrug, Amsterdam
 Van Brienenoordbrug, Rotterdam
 :nl:Westerkeersluis, Amsterdam (brug 346)

New Zealand 
 Te Matau ā Pohe, Whangarei
 Wynyard Crossing, Auckland

Norway 

 Skansen Bridge, Trondheim
 Tønsberg Canal Bridge, Tønsberg

Portugal 
 Ponte móvel de Leça

Russia 

 Volodarsky Bridge in Saint Petersburg
 Finland Railway Bridge in Saint Petersburg
 Alexander Nevsky Bridge in Saint Petersburg
 Peter the Great Bridge in Saint Petersburg
 Liteyny Bridge in Saint Petersburg
 Trinity Bridge in Saint Petersburg
 Palace Bridge in Saint Petersburg
 Blagoveshchensky Bridge in Saint Petersburg
 Exchange Bridge in Saint Petersburg
 Tuchkov Bridge in Saint Petersburg
 Sampsonievsky Bridge in Saint Petersburg
 Grenader Bridge in Saint Petersburg
 Kantemirovsky Bridge in Saint Petersburg

South Africa 
 At the Victoria & Alfred Waterfront in Cape Town

Spain 
 Puente de Deusto, Bilbao
 Puente del Ayuntamiento, Bilbao
 Puente de Alfonso XIII, Seville
 Puente de San Telmo, Seville
 José León de Carranza Bridge, Cádiz

Sweden 
 Danviksbron, Stockholm
 Klaffbron, Malmö
 Järnvägsbron (järnvägen Herrljunga-Uddevalla) Vänersborg

Thailand 
 Memorial Bridge, Bangkok
 Krungthep Bridge, Bangkok

Turkey 
 Galata Bridge, Istanbul

United Kingdom 
 Egerton Bridge, Birkenhead, Wirral
 Duke Street Bridge, Birkenhead Wirral
 Tower Road Bridge, Birkenhead, Wirral
 Corporation Bridge, Grimsby
 Bridgwater bascule bridge, Bridgwater, Somerset
 Sutton Road Bridge, Kingston upon Hull
 Drypool Bridge, Kingston upon Hull
 North Bridge, Kingston upon Hull
 Tower Bridge, London
 White Cart Bridge, popularly called the Renfrew Swing Bridge (misnomer) over River Cart, Renfrew
 Breydon Bridge, Great Yarmouth
 Haven Bridge, Great Yarmouth
 Lowestoft Bascule Bridge, Waveney
 Gull Wing Bridge, Lowestoft (due for completion 2023)
 Pero's Bridge, Bristol
 
 Redcliffe Bascule Bridge, Bristol
 Poole Bridge
 Twin Sails bridge, Poole, Dorset
 Town Bridge, across Weymouth Harbour, Dorset
 Countess Wear Bascule Bridge, Exeter Canal, Exeter
 River Bann Rail Bridge, Coleraine, Northern Ireland
 King George V Bridge, Keadby
 Walney Bridge, Barrow-in-Furness
 Stanley Dock, Liverpool
 Shadwell Basin Bridge, Shadwell, London
 Greenland Dock Bridge, Rotherhithe, London
 Surrey Basin Bridge, Rotherhithe, London
 The "White" Bridge, Carmarthen [Railway Bridge]
 Bann Bridge, Coleraine, County Londonderry, Northern Ireland
 Michaelson Road Bridge

United States 
(Alphabetical by state)
 Isleton Bridge, near Isleton, California
 Lefty O'Doul Bridge, San Francisco, California
 Park Street Bridge, Oakland, California
 High Street Bridge, Oakland, California
 Mystic River Bascule Bridge, Mystic, Connecticut
 Pequonnock River Railroad Bridge, Bridgeport, Connecticut
 Niantic River Railroad Bridge, East Lyme & Waterford, Connecticut
 Mianus River Railroad Bridge, Greenwich, Connecticut
 Housatonic River Railroad Bridge, Milford & Stratford, Connecticut
 Washington Bridge, US Route 1, Milford & Stratford, Connecticut
 Thames River Railroad Bridge, New London, Connecticut (bascule replaced by lift span 2008)
 Connecticut River Railroad Bridge, Old Saybrook & Old Lyme, Connecticut
 Saugatuck River Railroad Bridge, Westport, Connecticut
 Market Street Bridge, Wilmington, Delaware
 Highway 204 Bridge (or Skidaway Bridge), Isle of Hope, Georgia
 Causton Bluff Bridge, Savannah, Georgia
 Norfolk and Southern train trestle over the Savannah River, Augusta Georgia
 Various bridges across the Intracoastal Waterway in Florida
 FEC Strauss Trunnion Bascule Bridge in Jacksonville, Florida
 Various bridges across the Miami River in Miami, Florida
 Almost 40 in Chicago, Illinois, mostly across the Chicago River (and its north branch), but a few crossing the Calumet River.  Examples include the following, among others:
 Deering Bridge over North Branch of the Chicago River
 Ashland Avenue Bridge over North Branch of the Chicago River
 Webster Avenue Bridge over North Branch of the Chicago River
 Cortland Street Bridge over North Branch of the Chicago River
 Z-6 Railroad Bridge over North Branch of the Chicago River
 Z-2 Cherry Avenue Railroad Bridge over North Branch of the Chicago River
 Division Street Bridge over North Branch of the Chicago River
 North Halsted Street Bridge over North Branch of the Chicago River
 Chicago Avenue Bridge over North Branch of the Chicago River
 Ohio Street Bridge over North Branch of the Chicago River
 Grand Avenue Bridge over North Branch of the Chicago River
 Kinzie Street Bridge over North Branch of the Chicago River
 Kinzie Street C&NW Railroad Bridge over North Branch of the Chicago River
 Franklin-Orleans Avenue Bridge over Main Stem of the Chicago River
 Wells Street Bridge over Main Stem of the Chicago River
 LaSalle Street Bridge over Main Stem of the Chicago River
 Clark Street Bridge over Main Stem of the Chicago River
 Dearborn Street Bridge over Main Stem of the Chicago River
 State Street Bridge over Main Stem of the Chicago River
 Wabash Avenue Bridge over Main Stem of the Chicago River
 Michigan Avenue Bridge over Main Stem of the Chicago River
 Columbus Drive Bridge over Main Stem of the Chicago River
 Lake Shore Drive Bridge over Main Stem of the Chicago River
 Lake Street Bridge over South Branch of the Chicago River
 Randolph Street Bridge over South Branch of the Chicago River
 Washington Boulevard Bridge over South Branch of the Chicago River
 Madison Street Bridge over South Branch of the Chicago River
 Monroe Street Bridge over South Branch of the Chicago River
 Adams Street Bridge over South Branch of the Chicago River
 Jackson Boulevard Bridge over South Branch of the Chicago River
 Van Buren Street Bridge over South Branch of the Chicago River
 Congress Parkway Bridge over South Branch of the Chicago River
 Harrison Street Bridge over South Branch of the Chicago River
 Roosevelt Road Bridge over South Branch of the Chicago River
 B&O Railroad Chicago Terminal Bridge over South Branch of the Chicago River
 St. Charles Air Line Railroad Bridge over South Branch of the Chicago River
 18th Street Bridge over South Branch of the Chicago River
 Canal Street Railroad Bridge (aka Railroad Bridge #458) over South Branch of the Chicago River
 Canal Street Bridge over South Branch of the Chicago River
 Cermak Road Bridge over South Branch of the Chicago River
 South Halsted Street Bridge over South Branch of the Chicago River
 Loomis Street Bridge over South Branch of the Chicago River
 Chicago & Alton Railroad Bridge over South Branch of the Chicago River
 Ashland Avenue Bridge over Chicago Sanitary & Ship Canal
 Western Avenue Bridge over Chicago Sanitary & Ship Canal
 8 Track Railroad Bridge over Chicago Sanitary & Ship Canal
 California Avenue Bridge over Chicago Sanitary & Ship Canal
 Chicago & Illinois Western Railroad Bridge over Chicago Sanitary & Ship Canal
 Chicago Madison & Northern Railroad Bridge over Chicago Sanitary & Ship Canal
 Santa Fe Railroad Bridge over Chicago Sanitary & Ship Canal
 BRC Sanitary & Ship Canal Bridge over Chicago Sanitary & Ship Canal
 Cicero Avenue Bridge over Chicago Sanitary & Ship Canal
 Harlem Avenue Bridge over Chicago Sanitary & Ship Canal
 Elgin Joliet & Eastern Railroad Bridge#710 over Calumet River
 Ewing Avenue Bridge over Calumet River
 95th Street Bridge over Calumet River
 Pittsburgh Fort Wayne & Chicago Railroad Bridge#1 over Calumet River
 Pittsburgh Fort Wayne & Chicago Railroad Bridge #2 over Calumet River
 Lake Shore & Michigan Southern Railroad Bridge#1 over Calumet River
 Lake Shore & Michigan Southern Railroad Bridge#2 over Calumet River
 Baltimore & Ohio Chicago Terminal Railroad Bridge over Calumet River
 100th Street Bridge over Calumet River
 106th Street Bridge over Calumet River
 Chicago & Western Indiana Railroad Bridge over Calumet River
 Torrence Avenue Bridge over Calumet River
 Nickel Plate Road Railroad Bridge over Calumet River
 Indiana Harbor Belt Bridge over Grand Calumet River
 Six movable bridges are found in Joliet, Illinois:
 Ruby Street Bridge, [Chicago Style Bascule]
 Jackson Street Bridge, [Scherzer Rolling Lift Bascule]
 Cass Street Bridge, [Scherzer Rolling Lift Bascule]
 Jefferson Street Bridge, [Scherzer Rolling Lift Bascule]
 McDonough Street Bridge, [Scherzer Rolling Lift Bascule]
 Brandon Road Bridge, [Rail Height Bascule]
 Joe Page Bridge over Illinois River, Calhoun County, Illinois
 Franklin Street Bridge, Michigan City, Indiana
 St. Claude Avenue Bridge, New Orleans, Louisiana
 Maestri Bridge, between New Orleans, Louisiana and Slidell, Louisiana
 Lake Pontchartrain Causeway on Lake Pontchartrain in Louisiana
 Million Dollar Bridge (Maine), Portland, Maine (demolished, replaced by next entry)
 Casco Bay Bridge, Portland, Maine
 Hanover Street Bridge, Baltimore, Maryland
 Knapp's Narrows Drawbridge, Tilghman Island, Maryland
 Commuter Rail Bridge, Boston, Massachusetts
 Congress Street Bascule Bridge, Boston, Massachusetts, a Strauss bascule over the Fort Point Channel 
 Brightman Street Bridge, Fall River, Massachusetts
 Veterans Memorial Bridge, Fall River, Massachusetts
 Eel Pond Bridge, Woods Hole, Massachusetts
 Independence Bridge, Bay City, Michigan
 Lafayette Avenue Bridge, Bay City, Michigan
 Liberty Bridge, Bay City, Michigan
 Veterans Memorial Bridge, Bay City, Michigan
 Bicentennial Bridge connecting Benton Harbor and St. Joseph, Michigan
 Blossomland Bridge connecting Benton Harbor and St. Joseph, Michigan
 US 31–Island Lake Outlet Bridge, Charlevoix, Michigan
 Cheboygan Bascule Bridge, Cheboygan, Michigan
 US-31 Bascule Bridge spanning the Grand River connecting Grand Haven and Spring Lake
 Maple Street Bridge, Manistee, Michigan
 Cypress Street Bridge, Manistee, Michigan
 Pere Marquette Railroad Bridge, Port Huron, Michigan
CN Ranier Bridge, Rainy River, Ranier, Minnesota
 Bascule Bridge, John C. Stennis Space Center, Mississippi
 Bascule Bridge, Pascagoula River, Mississippi
 Neil Underwood Bridge, Hampton, New Hampshire
 Ferry Street Bridge, Buffalo, New York
 Bruckner Boulevard and Expressway (I-278), Bronx, New York City, New York (With separate northbound and southbound spans for the boulevard and for I-278, this "bridge" is in reality four double-leaf bascule bridges.)
 Pelham Bay Railroad Bridge, Bronx, New York City, New York
 Pelham Bridge, Bronx, New York City, New York
 Col. Patrick O'Rorke Bridge in Rochester, New York 
 Alfred Cunningham Memorial Bridge, New Bern, North Carolina
 Pasquotank River Bridge, Elizabeth City, North Carolina
 CSX Transportation Bridge, Wilmington, North Carolina
 Ashtabula lift bridge, Ashtabula, Ohio
 Charles Berry Bridge, Lorain, Ohio
 Port Clinton Lift Bridge, Port Clinton, Ohio
 Craig Memorial Bridge, Toledo, Ohio
 Lewis and Clark River Bridge, near Astoria, Oregon
 Old Youngs Bay Bridge, Astoria, Oregon
 Siuslaw River Bridge, Florence, Oregon
 Broadway Bridge, Portland, Oregon
 Burnside Bridge, Portland, Oregon
 Morrison Bridge, Portland, Oregon
 Passyunk Avenue Bridge, Philadelphia, Pennsylvania
 Tacony–Palmyra Bridge, Philadelphia, Pennsylvania
 University Avenue Bridge, Philadelphia, Pennsylvania
 Crook Point Bascule Bridge, Providence, Rhode Island
 Washington Bridge, Providence, Rhode Island
 Wappoo Creek Bridge, James Island, South Carolina
 John Ross Bridge (Commonly called Market Street Bridge), Chattanooga, Tennessee.
 Berkley Bridge, Norfolk, Virginia
 First Avenue South Bridge, Seattle, Washington
 Montlake Bridge, Seattle, Washington
 University Bridge, Seattle, Washington
 Fremont Bridge, Seattle, Washington
 Ballard Bridge, Seattle, Washington
 Salmon Bay Bridge, Seattle, Washington
 Ray Nitschke Memorial Bridge, Green Bay, Wisconsin
 Main Street Bridge, Racine, Wisconsin
 Sturgeon Bay Bridge (Michigan Street Bridge), Sturgeon Bay, Wisconsin
 Arlington Memorial Bridge, Virginia – Washington D.C.
 Woodrow Wilson Bridge, Alexandria, Virginia – Washington, D.C. - Prince George's County, Maryland

References

Bascule bridges